Miguel Marina (31 January 1928 – 23 October 2016) was a Spanish sports shooter. He competed at the 1968 Summer Olympics and the 1972 Summer Olympics.

References

1928 births
2016 deaths
Spanish male sport shooters
Olympic shooters of Spain
Shooters at the 1968 Summer Olympics
Shooters at the 1972 Summer Olympics
Sportspeople from Havana
20th-century Spanish people